Lajos Martin (30 August 1827 – 4 March 1897) was a Hungarian mathematician and engineer, known by his works in transportation and aerodynamics.

Life and work 
He was the seventh son of a wine grower. After completing his studies in the Roman Catholic Secondary School, he began studies in the University of Pest. The 1848 European revolutions disrupted his studies and due his active participation was imprisoned and after enrolled in the Imperial Army. Finally, he finished his studies graduating in 1854 in the Military Engineering Academy in Vienna.

He was teaching in the Vienna's Military School until 1859 when he left the army and returned to Buda where he worked privately as civil engineer until 1861. From 1863 to 1868 he was teaching at secondary schools in Selmecbánya and Pressburg and he wrote some textbooks on mathematics in this level.

In 1872 he was appointed professor of mathematics in the university of Kolozsvár. He became rector of the university in 1895–1896 and in his inaugural discourse he spoke about the importance of flights in the transportation of people and goods.

He began his research in ballistics in the army, and he followed his theoretical and experimental works in this area all his life. He became also interested in hydraulics and in the search of the most efficient propeller. In his last years he worked in aerodynamics and he had a very clear idea about aviation would be in the future.

References

Bibliography

External links 
 

1827 births
1897 deaths
19th-century Hungarian mathematicians
Engineers from Budapest
Members of the Hungarian Academy of Sciences
Academic staff of Franz Joseph University
People from Buda
Hungarian inventors